M. Narayana Reddy (10 September 1931 – 2 February 2020) was an  Indian lawyer and politician from Telangana. He was a member of the Lok Sabha and Andhra Pradesh Legislative Assembly.

Biography
Reddy was born on 10 September 1931 at Sunket in Nizamabad. He studied at Chadarghat College and Osmania University.

Reddy was elected as a member of the Lok Sabha from Nizamabad as an independent candidate in 1967. He was the first parliamentarian who raised the issue of separate Telangana in Lok Sabha. In 1972 he was elected as a member of the Andhra Pradesh Legislative Assembly from Bodhan as an Indian National Congress candidate.

Reddy died on 2 February 2020 at a private hospital in Nizamabad at the age of 88.

References

1931 births
2020 deaths
People from Nizamabad district
Members of the Andhra Pradesh Legislative Assembly
Lok Sabha members from Telangana
Osmania University alumni
India MPs 1967–1970
Indian National Congress politicians from Telangana
Independent politicians in India
Indian lawyers
Indian National Congress politicians from Andhra Pradesh